Sir Keith Edward Mills,  (born 15 May, 1950) is an English entrepreneur and deputy chairman of the London Organising Committee of the Olympic and Paralympic Games.

Early life
Mills was born in Brentwood.  He attended St Martin's School, Brentwood on Hanging Hill Lane in Hutton, Brentwood.

Career
Mills worked for over twenty years in marketing and advertising. Having left school with no qualifications, he started with The Economist at the age of fifteen as a copy assistant and then at the Financial Times and Investors Chronicle, where he was responsible for their marketing programmes. From there, he moved into advertising in London. In 1981, he led a management buyout of the London office of the New York-based company Nadler & Larimer, becoming the chief executive. In 1985, he co-founded Mills, Smith & Partners.

He was also a non-executive director at Tottenham Hotspur Football Club but stepped down in January 2016.

In 2011, Mills was awarded an Honorary Degree (Doctor of Laws) from the University of Bath. He received an Honorary Degree from the University of Essex in 2013.

Loyalty cards
Mills is chiefly known for inventing the Air Miles (in 1988) and Nectar Card (in 2002) loyalty card schemes. Similar "frequent flyer" schemes had been launched in the US in May 1981 by American Airlines and United Airlines.

Air Miles
Air Miles was set up in 1988 when Mills started the Loyalty Management Group, then known as Air Miles International Group BV. He had the idea in 1987 when working at his advertising agency, which had Shell and British Caledonian as clients who were looking to make the most of their customer base without devaluing the image of the products. People would buy Air Miles from Shell petrol to use on British Caledonian. He approached British Airways and they liked the idea. He then sold similar ideas in the United States and Canada, moving to the United States in 1990. In 1993, the US Air Miles system collapsed, costing him £15 million. In 1994, his 49% share of the scheme was sold to British Airways, although he still retains the intellectual property rights.

Nectar Card
Loyalty Management UK was started in 2001, which produced the Nectar Card in September, 2002. In December 2007, the company was sold for £350m to the Canadian company Aeroplan, in which he had 46% of sharehold, netting £160m.

Olympics
From September 2003, he became chief executive and international president of the London 2012 campaign, which saw London selected as host for the 2012 Summer Olympics. He served as deputy chairman of the London Organising Committee for the Olympic Games. At the end of the project, Mills was awarded the Olympic Order. He later set up the charity Sported with £10 million of his own money to deliver on London 2012's legacy promises.

National Lottery 
In 2020, SAZKA Group, Europe’s largest lottery operator, announced it had appointed Sir Keith Mills as Bid Chair of the UK team for the Fourth National Lottery Licence Competition. In March 2022, following a "fair, open and robust competition", the Gambling Commission named Allwyn as their preferred applicant. In January 2023, the Gambling Commission approved the acquisition of Camelot UK Lotteries Ltd. by Allwyn, with Sir Keith being appointed Chairman of Camelot UK Lotteries Ltd in February 2023 when the transaction was completed.

Coutts AIG action
The same month that Loyalty Management UK was sold, Mills bought £73m of the "enhanced fund" version of AIG Life "premier bonds" on the advice of Coutts, the private bank owned by Royal Bank of Scotland. Coutts recommended to Mills that he place his money in AIG Life Premier Bonds as a way of protecting his capital. They also said it would be a safe alternative to bank deposits and would earn a slightly better interest rate. Coutts said Mills' money would be safe, as AIG was the largest insurance company in the world, AA rated, and that the bonds would provide instant access to his money, just like a deposit account. Later, given the negative press reports about the future of AIG, Mills queried Coutts, in writing, the safety of keeping his money with AIG. Coutts replied that they did not have concerns about these bonds, so Mills retained them. AIG Life is a UK subsidiary of American International Group, the US insurer rescued by the US Federal Reserve on 16 September 2008.

Personal life
He married Maureen in 1974; they have two children and live near Tunbridge Wells in Kent. Lady Mills supports her husband's charity work and support for sports, including the successful bid for the London 2012 Olympic and Paralympic games.

He enjoys sailing. In 1999, he was member of a team captained by Alex Thomson that won the Clipper Round the World Yacht Race, and in 2002, he skippered his Oyster 485 yacht in the Atlantic Rally for Cruisers. He founded Team Origin in 2007, and is a member of the Royal Thames Yacht Club.

Honours
Mills was knighted in the 2006 New Years Honours List in recognition of his services to sport. He was appointed Knight Grand Cross of the Order of the British Empire (GBE) in the 2013 New Years Honours List for services to the London 2012 Olympic and Paralympic Games. He was appointed a deputy lieutenant for the County of Kent in September 2008. This gave him the Post Nominal Letters "DL" for Life.

References

External links
 Sir Keith Mills at tottenhamhotspur.com
 Loyalty Management Group bio
 Early life
 Aeroplan buys Nectar in December 2007
 Guardian interview April 2005

1950 births
Living people
Knights Bachelor
Knights Grand Cross of the Order of the British Empire
People from Brentwood, Essex
Deputy Lieutenants of Kent
English businesspeople
Recipients of the Olympic Order
Recipients of the Paralympic Order